6,14-Endoethenotetrahydrooripavine is the central nucleus, or backbone, of a class of morphinan opioids known as the Bentley compounds and may be considered their "privileged scaffold". These include but are not limited to etorphine and buprenorphine.  They usually have thebaine or oripavine as their precursor in their syntheses (and are thus termed "thevinols" and "orvinols", respectively).

See also
 Bridged oripavine derivatives
 Acetorphine
 Thienorphine

References

Semisynthetic opioids
Mu-opioid receptor agonists
4,5-Epoxymorphinans